Diospyros neurosepala is a tree in the family Ebenaceae. Inflorescences bear up to six flowers. The specific epithet  is from the Greek meaning "sinewy sepal", referring to the veined fruit calyx. D. neurosepala is endemic to Borneo.

References

neurosepala
Plants described in 1933
Endemic flora of Borneo
Trees of Borneo